T & T High School is an educational institution in Motijheel T & T Colony, Dhaka, Bangladesh. Although the school was set up to cater for the children of the surrounding areas, students come from all parts of Dhaka. It was established in 1962 as a junior school, but was later converted to a high school.

References

High schools in Bangladesh
Educational institutions established in 1962
Schools in Dhaka District
Organisations based in Motijheel
1962 establishments in East Pakistan